Kristina Esfandiari (born 4 March 1988) is an American singer-songwriter and producer who writes music and performs under the monikers Dalmatian, Miserable, and NGHTCRWLR, and with the bands King Woman and Sugar High.

Early life
Kristina Esfandiari was born to immigrant parents, an Iranian father and a Serbian mother. They raised her in a Charismatic Christian church. She was raised in Sacramento. At 22, she moved to the Bay Area.

Career 
Esfandiari began her musical career as a vocalist for shoegaze band Whirr from 2012 to 2013 and was featured on the EP Around,before moving onto her own projects.

In her early years as a performer, Esfandiari became well known for her heavy and dramatic vocals during live shows. As of June 2021, Esfandiari releases music under a multitude of personas: Miserable, KRIS, Dalmatian, Sugar High, and NGHTCRWLR.

Esfandiari is best known as the lead vocalist for the band King Woman. Esfandiari began King Woman as a solo project in 2009. The project later became a band, after she was joined by her childhood friend, Joey Raygoza.

Dalmatian 
Esfandiari debuted her Dalmatian persona via her social media channels. Dalmatian is a rap project, inspired by artists including Elkk and JRAL. Dalmatian's first release was single "Pain Thresold", followed by "Friday the 13th", released October 2020. Speaking to Revolver in October 2020, Esfandiari said that she was working on Dalmatian's first album, featuring JRAL and Elkk.

King Woman 
King Woman released their first successful EP, Doubt, with The Flenser in 2015. The EP was inspired by Esfandiari's experiences of trying to leave her religious upbringing.

King Woman signed to Relapse Records and released their debut LP, Created in the Image of Suffering, which was labelled by Pitchfork as one of the best rock albums of 2017. Writing for Beats Per Minute’s “Darkest Albums” feature, John Amen called the album “a disturbing journey through consternation, despair, and heretical inquiry.” King Woman's second album, Celestial Blues, was announced in June 2021, as was its July 2021 oncoming release by Relapse Records. The first single from the album, "Morning Star", was released ahead of the LP. This was followed by a second single, "Psychic Wound", and a third single, “Boghz”.
The album was released to positive reviews.

Miserable 
Miserable is a shoegaze project debuted by Esfandiari in 2014 with EPs Halloween Dream and Dog Days. Uncontrollable, Miserable's debut album, was released via The Native Sound in April 2016.  Written and recorded over the course of a year, the LP is the most emotional release in Esfandiari's history as an artist. The album quickly became a fan favourite and her breakthrough record, according to most mainstream media. Pitchfork and Spin praised her work. She later toured extensively in the US.

NGHTCRWLR 
NGHTCRWLR has been described as a "mixture of drone, harsh noise and industrial sounds". Her influences for the project include Yves Tumor and The Prodigy. NGHTCRWLR's debut album, Let the Children Scream, was released via Amniote Editions in January 2020.

Sugar High 
Sugar High is a collaboration with producer and singer-songwriter Darcy Baylis, who Esfandiari met over Instagram in 2018. The duo released their debut album, Love Addict, in 2020 on Dero Arcade. "Losing" and "Ugly" were released as singles from the album.

Discography

Dalmatian 
Singles / EPs
 Pain Threshold (2019)
 Friday the 13th (2020)

King Woman 
Albums
 Created in the Image of Suffering (2017)
Celestial Blues (2021)

Singles / EPs
 Degrida / Sick Bed (2013)
 Dove / Fond Affections (2014)
 Doubt EP (2015)

Miserable 
Albums
 Uncontrollable (2016)

Singles / EPs
 Split with Grey Zine (2013)
 Halloween Dream EP (2014)
 Dog Days EP (2014)
 Loverboy EP (2018)

NGHTCRWLR 
Albums
 Let the Children Scream (2020)

Sugar High 
Albums
 Love Addict (2020)

Whirr 
Singles / EPs
 Around EP (2013)

References 

Living people
American women songwriters
American people of Iranian descent
Iranian songwriters
Whirr (band) members
21st-century American women
1988 births
American people of Serbian descent